Ariadne actisanes, the large castor, is a butterfly in the family Nymphalidae. It is found in Nigeria, Cameroon, Gabon, the Republic of the Congo and the Democratic Republic of the Congo. The habitat consists of disturbed areas in forests.

References

Butterflies described in 1875
Biblidinae
Butterflies of Africa
Taxa named by William Chapman Hewitson